The International Union of Pure and Applied Chemistry publishes many books which contain its complete list of definitions. The definitions are divided into seven "colour books": Gold, Green, Blue, Purple, Orange, White, and Red. There is also an eighth book—the "Silver Book".

The eight colour books

Blue Book
Nomenclature of Organic Chemistry, commonly referred to by chemists as the Blue Book, is a collection of recommendations on organic chemical nomenclature published at irregular intervals by the International Union of Pure and Applied Chemistry (IUPAC). A full edition was published in 1979, an abridged and updated version of which was published in 1993 as A Guide to IUPAC Nomenclature of Organic Compounds. Both of these are now out-of-print in their paper versions, but are available free of charge in electronic versions. After the release of a draft version for public comment in 2004 and the publication of several revised sections in the journal Pure and Applied Chemistry, a fully revised version was published in print in 2013.

Gold Book 

The Compendium of Chemical Terminology is a book published by the International Union of Pure and Applied Chemistry (IUPAC) containing internationally accepted definitions for terms in chemistry. Work on the first edition was initiated by Victor Gold, thus spawning its informal name: the Gold Book.

The first edition was published in 1987 and the second edition, edited by A. D. McNaught and A. Wilkinson, was published in 1997. A slightly expanded version of the Gold Book is also freely searchable online. Translations have also been published in French, Spanish and Polish.

Green Book 

Quantities, Units and Symbols in Physical Chemistry, commonly known as the Green Book, is a compilation of terms and symbols widely used in the field of physical chemistry. It also includes a table of physical constants, tables listing the properties of elementary particles, chemical elements, and nuclides, and information about conversion factors that are commonly used in physical chemistry.  The most recent edition is the third edition, originally published by IUPAC in 2007. A second printing of the third edition was released in 2008; this printing made several minor revisions to the 2007 text. A third printing of the third edition was released in 2011. The text of the third printing is identical to that of the second printing.

Orange Book 

The Compendium of Analytical Nomenclature is a book published by the International Union of Pure and Applied Chemistry (IUPAC) containing internationally accepted definitions for terms in analytical chemistry. It has traditionally been published in an orange cover, hence its informal name, the Orange Book.

Although the book is described as the "Definitive Rules", there have been three editions published; the first in 1978, the second in 1987 and the third in 1998. The third edition is also available online. A Catalan translation has also been published (1987).

Purple Book 

The first edition of the Compendium of Macromolecular Terminology and Nomenclature, known as the Purple Book, was published in 1991. It is about the nomenclature of polymers. The second and latest edition was published in December 2008 and is also available for download.

Red Book 

Nomenclature of Inorganic Chemistry, by chemists commonly referred to as the Red Book, is a collection of recommendations on inorganic chemical nomenclature. It is published at irregular intervals by the International Union of Pure and Applied Chemistry (IUPAC). The last full edition was published in 2005, in both paper and electronic versions.

Silver Book 
The IUPAC also publishes a Silver Book, not listed with the other "colour books", titled Compendium of Terminology and Nomenclature of Properties in Clinical Laboratory Sciences.  De Gruyter | 2017

White Book 
The Biochemical Nomenclature and Related Documents (1992) or White Book contains definitions pertaining to biochemical research compiled jointly by IUPAC and the International Union of Biochemistry and Molecular Biology.

See also
 International Union of Pure and Applied Chemistry nomenclature
 IUPAC polymer nomenclature

References
11. Website publication of Silver Book: The Silver Book and the NPU Format for Clinical Laboratory Science Reports Regarding Properties, Units, and Symbols . Published Online: 2017-04-25; Published in Print: 2017-04-25

External links

IUPAC Color Books (main page)

Gold Book
 Online version

Green Book
2011 version

Red Book
2005 version
Corrections to 2005 edition (QMUL)
Additional corrections to 2005 edition (QMUL)
Brief guide to the nomenclature of inorganic chemistry (v1.3, 2017)
Four-page summary of the brief guide
Nomenclature of Inorganic Chemistry II: Recommendations 2000 (only "Chapter 1 Polyanions")
1970 edition

Blue Book
Online version (1979, 1993)
Official corrections to 1993 edition
2004 draft of 2013 edition

Purple Book

2nd edition (2008)
Two-page summary

Orange Book
 Online version (3rd edition, 1997)

Silver Book
Four-page summary

White Book
Biochemical Nomenclature and Related Documents (QMUL)

Chemistry reference works
Chemical nomenclature